Charles Melvin VC (2 May 1885 – 17 July 1941) was a Scottish recipient of the Victoria Cross, the highest and most prestigious award for gallantry in the face of the enemy that can be awarded to British and Commonwealth forces.

The Medal
Private Melvin's citation for the award of the Victoria Cross, as published in the Supplement to the London Gazette (dated 26 November 1917), states:

His Victoria Cross is displayed at the Black Watch Museum (Perth, Scotland). Melvin is commemorated with a plaque on Kirriemuir Town Hall, a carved flagstone in Kirriemuir's Cumberland Close, and a street called Charles Melvin Gardens, also in Kirriemuir.

References

Monuments to Courage (David Harvey, 1999)
The Register of the Victoria Cross (This England, 1997)
Scotland's Forgotten Valour (Graham Ross, 1995)

British World War I recipients of the Victoria Cross
British Army personnel of World War I
Black Watch soldiers
1885 births
1941 deaths
People from Angus, Scotland
British Army recipients of the Victoria Cross